Unleashed is a Swedish death metal band that was formed in 1989 by Johnny Hedlund in Stockholm. Common lyrical themes found in the band's music include Viking culture, recollection of a pre-Christian world, and Norse folklore. A number of their recent songs also contain references to J. R. R. Tolkien. Unleashed (along with Dismember, Entombed and Grave) is considered one of the "big four" of Swedish death metal.

History
Unleashed was founded in 1989 by vocalist and bassist Johnny Hedlund. Unleashed recorded demos "Revenge" and "Utter Dark", which got them a record deal with the German label Century Media Records. In 1991, the band released their debut studio album, Where No Life Dwells, and toured with Morbid Angel in Europe and the US.

In 1992, Unleashed released their second studio album, Shadows in the Deep, including a cover version of Venom's "Countess Bathory". Their next studio albums were Across the Open Sea in 1993 and Victory in 1995, the latter being the last album which guitarist Fredrik Lindgren played on. Lindgren began to focus strongly on playing punk rock, so Unleashed replaced him with Fredrik Folkare, who played guitar on the fifth Unleashed studio album Warrior in 1997.

The band went on hiatus after 7–8 years of recording and touring. They were concentrating on life outside the music business, their musical side projects, and studying. After a reissue of the band's classics in 2002, the band released a new album called Hell's Unleashed in the same year, and they began to tour once again. This was also the same year Hedlund had come under scrutiny because of allegations that he was a Nazi sympathizer. Dave Grohl of Foo Fighters initially had intended to approach Hedlund, hoping he would contribute lead vocals to one of the songs for his Probot metal project, but the album producer, Matt Sweeney, discouraged him from doing so because of the rumors of Hedlund's alleged sympathies. Hedlund quickly branded these accusations as false and stated, Unleashed praises nature, beast and man. Man....regardless of background, place of birth or color of the skin.

In 2004, Unleashed released their seventh studio album, Sworn Allegiance. In October 2006, the band released their eighth studio album, Midvinterblot. Unleashed toured Europe in November 2006 as part of the Masters of Death tour, with Grave, Dismember, and Entombed. On February and March 2007, they headlined a North American tour with Krisiun and Belphegor. June 2008 saw the release of their ninth studio album entitled Hammer Battalion.

On 24 July 2009, Unleashed signed a contract with German label Nuclear Blast Records for the release of their tenth album entitled As Yggdrasil Trembles. In the press statement the band said, "We are very much looking forward to this new cooperation! The recording of the album is scheduled for October/November this year."

In summer 2010, Unleashed was part of the Summer Breeze Open Air and the With Full Force heavy metal festivals in Germany. The band's 11th studio album Odalheim was released also on Nuclear Blast Records in April 2012, and their twelfth record Dawn of the Nine was released 24 April 2015. In early 2018, it was announced that Unleashed had signed to prominent Austrian label Napalm Records, through whom they released their next album entitled The Hunt for White Christ later that year. In February 2021, the band announced that they were working on their 14th studio album. The resulting No Sign of Life was released in the fall of 2021.

Members

Current members 
 Johnny Hedlund – vocals, bass (1989–present)
 Anders Schultz – drums (1989–present)
 Tomas Olsson – rhythm guitar (1990–present)
 Fredrik Folkare – lead guitar (1995–present)

Former members
 Fredrik Lindgren – lead guitar (1989–1995)
 Robert Sennebäck – vocals, rhythm guitar (1989–1990)

Timeline

Discography

Studio albums
 Where No Life Dwells (1991)
 Shadows in the Deep (1992)
 Across the Open Sea (1993)
 Victory (1995)
 Warrior (1997)
 Hell's Unleashed (2002)
 Sworn Allegiance (2004)
 Midvinterblot (2006)
 Hammer Battalion (2008)
 As Yggdrasil Trembles (2010)
 Odalheim (2012)
 Dawn of the Nine (2015) 
 The Hunt for White Christ (2018)
 No Sign of Life (2021)

EPs and singles
...And the Laughter Has Died (1991)

Live albums
Live in Vienna '93 (1993)
Eastern Blood Hail to Poland (1996)

Compilation albums
Masters of Brutality (Fnac Music, 1992)
Viking Raids (The Best Of 1991-2004) (2008)

Boxed sets
...And We Shall Triumph in Victory (2003)
Immortal Glory (The Complete Century Media Years) (2008)

References

External links

 Unleashed - official website

Musical groups established in 1989
Swedish death metal musical groups
Swedish viking metal musical groups
Century Media Records artists
Nuclear Blast artists